Harvard Law School (HLS) is the law school of Harvard University, a private research university in Cambridge, Massachusetts. Founded in 1817, it is the oldest continuously operating law school in the United States.
 	
Each class in the three-year JD program has approximately 560 students—among the largest of the top 150 ranked law schools in the United States. The first-year class is broken into seven sections of approximately 80 students, who take most first-year classes together. Aside from the JD program, Harvard also awards both LLM and SJD degrees. Harvard's uniquely large class size and prestige have led the law school to graduate a great many distinguished alumni in the judiciary, government, and the business world.

According to Harvard Law's 2020 ABA-required disclosures, 99% of 2019 graduates passed the bar exam. The school's graduates accounted for more than one-quarter of all Supreme Court clerks between 2000 and 2010, more than any other law school in the United States.
 		 	
Harvard Law School's founding is traditionally linked to the funding of Harvard's first professorship in law, paid for from a bequest from the estate of Isaac Royall Jr., a colonial American landowner and slaveowner. HLS is home to the world's largest academic law library. The school has an estimated 135 full-time faculty members.

History

Bequest by Isaac Royall, founding, and relationship with slavery
Harvard Law School's founding is traced to the establishment of a 'law department' at Harvard in 1817. Dating the founding to the year of the creation of the law department makes Harvard Law School the oldest continuously operating law school in the United States. William & Mary Law School opened first in 1779, but it closed due to the American Civil War, reopening in 1920. The University of Maryland School of Law was chartered in 1816 but did not begin classes until 1824, and it also closed during the Civil War.

The founding of the law department came two years after the establishment of Harvard's first endowed professorship in law, funded by a bequest from the estate of wealthy slave-owner Isaac Royall Jr., in 1817. Royall left roughly 1,000 acres of land in Massachusetts to Harvard when he died in exile in Nova Scotia, where he fled to as a Loyalist during the American Revolution, in 1781, "to be appropriated towards the endowing a Professor of Laws ... or a Professor of Physick and Anatomy, whichever the said overseers and Corporation [of the college] shall judge to be best." The value of the land, when fully liquidated in 1809, was $2,938; the Harvard Corporation allocated $400 from the income generated by those funds to create the Royall Professorship of Law in 1815. The Royalls were so involved in the slave trade, that "the labor of slaves underwrote the teaching of law in Cambridge." The dean of the law school traditionally held the Royall chair; deans Elena Kagan and Martha Minow declined the Royall chair due to its origins in the proceeds of slavery.

The Royall family's coat of arms, which shows three stacked wheat sheaves on a blue background, was adopted as part of the law school's arms in 1936, topped with the university's motto (Veritas, Latin for 'truth').  Until the school began investigating its connections with slavery in the 2010s, most alumni and faculty at the time were unaware of the origins of the arms. In March 2016, following requests by students, the school decided to remove the emblem because of its association with slavery. In November 2019, Harvard announced that a working group had been tasked to develop a new emblem. In August 2021, the new Harvard Law School emblem was introduced.

Royall's Medford estate, the Isaac Royall House, is now a museum which features the only remaining slave quarters in the northeast United States. In 2019, the government of Antigua and Barbuda requested reparations from Harvard Law School on the ground that it benefitted from Royall's enslavement of people in the country.

Growth and the Langdell curriculum
By 1827, the school, with one faculty member, was struggling. Nathan Dane, a prominent alumnus of the college, then endowed the Dane Professorship of Law, insisting that it be given to then Supreme Court Justice Joseph Story. For a while, the school was called "Dane Law School."  In 1829, John H. Ashmun, son of Eli Porter Ashmun and brother of George Ashmun, accepted a professorship and closed his Northampton Law School, with many of his students following him to Harvard. Story's belief in the need for an elite law school based on merit and dedicated to public service helped build the school's reputation at the time, although the contours of these beliefs have not been consistent throughout its history. Enrollment remained low through the 19th century as university legal education was considered to be of little added benefit to apprenticeships in legal practice.  After first trying lowered admissions standards, in 1848 HLS eliminated admissions requirements entirely.  In 1869, HLS also eliminated examination requirements.

In the 1870s, under Dean Christopher Columbus Langdell, HLS introduced what has become the standard first-year curriculum for American law schools – including classes in contracts, property, torts, criminal law, and civil procedure. At Harvard, Langdell also developed the case method of teaching law, now the dominant pedagogical model at U.S. law schools.  Langdell's notion that law could be studied as a "science" gave university legal education a reason for being distinct from vocational preparation. Critics at first defended the old lecture method because it was faster and cheaper and made fewer demands on faculty and students. Advocates said the case method had a sounder theoretical basis in scientific research and the inductive method. Langdell's graduates became leading professors at other law schools where they introduced the case method. The method was facilitated by casebooks. From its founding in 1900, the Association of American Law Schools promoted the case method in law schools that sought accreditation.

20th century
During the 20th century, Harvard Law School was known for its competitiveness. For example, Bob Berring called it "a samurai ring where you can test your swordsmanship against the swordsmanship of the strongest intellectual warriors from around the nation." When Langdell developed the original law school curriculum, Harvard President Charles Eliot told him to make it "hard and long." An urban legend holds that incoming students are told to "Look to your left, look to your right, because one of you won't be here by the end of the year." Scott Turow's memoir One L and John Jay Osborn's novel The Paper Chase describe such an environment. Trailing many of its peers, Harvard Law did not admit women as students until 1950, for the class of 1953.

Eleanor Kerlow's book Poisoned Ivy: How Egos, Ideology, and Power Politics Almost Ruined Harvard Law School criticized the school for a 1980s political dispute between newer and older faculty members over accusations of insensitivity to minority and feminist issues. Divisiveness over such issues as political correctness lent the school the title "Beirut on the Charles."

In Broken Contract: A Memoir of Harvard Law School, Richard Kahlenberg criticized the school for driving students away from public interest and toward work in high-paying law firms. Kahlenberg's criticisms are supported by Granfield and Koenig's study, which found that "students [are directed] toward service in the most prestigious law firms, both because they learn that such positions are their destiny and because the recruitment network that results from collective eminence makes these jobs extremely easy to obtain." The school has also been criticized for its large first year class sizes (at one point there were 140 students per classroom; in 2001 there were 80), a cold and aloof administration, and an inaccessible faculty. The latter stereotype is a central plot element of The Paper Chase and appears in Legally Blonde.

In response to the above criticisms, HLS eventually implemented the once-criticized but now dominant approach pioneered by Dean Robert Hutchins at Yale Law School, of shifting the competitiveness to the admissions process while making law school itself a more cooperative experience. Robert Granfield and Thomas Koenig's 1992 study of Harvard Law students that appeared in The Sociological Quarterly found that students "learn to cooperate with rather than compete against classmates," and that contrary to "less eminent" law schools, students "learn that professional success is available for all who attend, and that therefore, only neurotic 'gunners' try to outdo peers."

21st century

Under Kagan, the second half of the 2000s saw significant academic changes since the implementation of the Langdell curriculum. In 2006, the faculty voted unanimously to approve a new first-year curriculum, placing greater emphasis on problem-solving, administrative law, and international law. The new curriculum was implemented in stages over the next several years, with the last new course, a first year practice-oriented problem solving workshop, being instituted in January 2010. In late 2008, the faculty decided that the school should move to an Honors/Pass/Low Pass/Fail (H/P/LP/F) grading system, much like those in place at Yale and Stanford Law Schools. The system applied to half the courses taken by students in the Class of 2010 and fully started with the Class of 2011.

In 2009, Kagan was appointed solicitor general of the United States by President Barack Obama and resigned the deanship. On June 11, 2009, Harvard University president, Drew Gilpin Faust named Martha Minow as the new dean. She assumed the position on July 1, 2009. On January 3, 2017, Minow announced that she would conclude her tenure as dean at the end of the academic year. In June 2017, John F. Manning was named as the new dean, effective as of July 1, 2017.

In September 2017, the school unveiled a plaque acknowledging the indirect role played by slavery in its history:

Reputation
The acceptance rate for the JD Class of 2024 was 6.8%. HLS was ranked as the fourth best law school in the United States (in a tie with Columbia Law School, and trailing only Yale Law School, Stanford Law School, and the University of Chicago Law School) by U.S. News & World Report in its 2023 rankings, the most widely referenced rankings publisher in the American legal community. HLS was also ranked first, with a perfect overall assessment score of 100.0, by QS World University Rankings in 2019. It is also ranked first by the 2019 Academic Ranking of World Universities.

In November 2022, the law school made a joint decision along with Yale Law School to withdraw from the U.S. News & World Report Best Law Schools rankings, citing the system's "flawed methodology."

Employment
According to the school's employment summary for 2020 graduates, 86.8% were employed in bar passage required jobs and another 5.3% were employed in J.D. advantage jobs.

Costs
The cost of tuition for the 2022-2023 school year (9 month term) is $72,430. A Mandatory HUHS Student Health Fee is $1,304, bringing the total direct costs for the 2022-2023 school year to $73,734.

The total cost of attendance (indicating the cost of tuition, fees, and living expenses) at Harvard Law for the 2021–2022 academic year is $104,200.

Heraldic shield

In 2016, the governing body of the university, the Harvard Corporation, voted to retire the law school's 80-year-old heraldic shield. The shield, depicting three garbs (the heraldic term for wheat sheaves), was based in part upon the coat of arms of Isaac Royall Jr., a university benefactor who had endowed the first professorship in the law school. The shield had become a source of contention among a group of law school students, who objected to the Royall family's history as slave-owners.

The president of the university and dean of the law school, acting upon the recommendation of a committee formed to study the issue, ultimately agreed with its majority decision, that the shield was inconsistent with the values of both the university and the law school. Their recommendation was ultimately adopted by the Harvard Corporation and on March 15, 2016, the shield was ordered retired.

On August 23, 2021, it was announced that a new shield was approved by the Harvard Corporation. The new design features Harvard's traditional motto,  (Latin for 'truth'), resting above the Latin phrase Lex et Iustitia, meaning 'law and justice'. According to the HLS Shield Working Group's final report, the expanding or diverging lines, some with no obvious beginning or end, are meant to convey a sense of broad scope or great distance — the limitlessness of the school's work and mission. The radial lines also allude to the latitudinal and longitudinal lines that define the arc of the earth, conveying the global reach of the Law School's community and impact. The multifaceted, radiating form — a form inspired by architectural details found in both Austin Hall and Hauser Hall — seeks to convey dynamism, complexity, inclusiveness, connectivity, and strength.

Student organizations and journals
Harvard Law School has more than 90 student organizations that are active on campus. These organizations include the student-edited journals, Harvard Law Record, and the HLS Drama Society, which organizes the annual Harvard Law School Parody, the Harvard Legal Aid Bureau as well as other political, social, service, and athletic groups.

HLS Student Government is the primary governing, advocacy, and representative body for Law School students. In addition, students are represented at the university level by the Harvard Graduate Council.

Harvard Law Review

Students of the Juris Doctor (JD) program are involved in preparing and publishing the Harvard Law Review, one of the most highly cited university law reviews, as well as a number of other law journals and an independent student newspaper. The Harvard Law Review was first published in 1887 and has been staffed and edited by some of the school's most notable alumni.

In addition to the journal, the Harvard Law Review Association, in conjunction with the Columbia Law Review, University of Pennsylvania Law Review, and Yale Law Journal also publishes The Bluebook: A Uniform System of Citation, the most widely followed authority for legal citation formats in the United States.

The student newspaper, the Harvard Law Record, has been published continuously since the 1940s, making it one of the oldest law school newspapers in the country, and has included the exploits of fictional law student Fenno for decades. The Harvard Law School Forum on Corporate Governance and Financial Regulation, formerly known as the Harvard Law School Corporate Governance Blog, is one of the most widely read law websites in the country.

The Harvard Law Bulletin is the magazine of record for Harvard Law School. The Harvard Law Bulletin was first published in April 1948. The magazine is currently published twice a year, but in previous years has been published four or six times a year. The magazine was first published online in fall 1997.

Harvard Law School student journals 
 Harvard Law Review
 Harvard Business Law Review
 Harvard Civil Rights-Civil Liberties Law Review
 Harvard BlackLetter Law Journal
 Harvard Environmental Law Review
 Harvard Human Rights Journal
 Harvard International Law Journal
 Harvard Journal of Law & Gender (formerly Women's Law Journal)
 Harvard Journal of Law & Public Policy
 Harvard Journal of Law and Technology
 Harvard Journal of Sports and Entertainment Law
 Harvard Journal on Legislation
 Harvard Latinx Law Review
 Harvard Law & Policy Review
 Harvard National Security Journal
 Harvard Negotiation Law Review
 Unbound: Harvard Journal of the Legal Left

Harvard Law School legal clinics 

 Election Law Clinic
 Animal Law and Policy Clinic
 Criminal Justice Institute
 Crimmigration Clinic
 Cyberlaw Clinic
 Education Law Clinic
 Emmett Environmental Law and Policy Clinic
 Immigration and Refugee Clinic
 Legal Aid Bureau
 Dispute Systems Design Clinic
 International Human Rights Clinic
 Institute to End Mass Incarceration Clinic
 Mediation Clinic
 Religious Freedom Clinic
 Transactional Law Clinic
 Center for Health Law and Policy Innovation 
 Food Law and Policy Clinic
 Health Law and Policy Clinic
 Legal Services Center
 Domestic Violence and Family Clinic 
 Federal Tax Clinic
 Housing Law Clinic
 LGBTQ+ Advocacy Clinic
 Predatory Lending and Consumer Protection Clinic
 Veterans Law and Disability Benefits Clinic

Notable people

Alumni

Harvard's prestige and large class size have enabled it to graduate a large number of distinguished alumni.

Rutherford B. Hayes, the 19th president of the United States, graduated from HLS. Additionally, Barack Obama, the 44th president of the United States, graduated from HLS and was president of the Harvard Law Review. His wife, Michelle Obama, is also a graduate of Harvard Law School. Past presidential candidates who are HLS graduates, include Michael Dukakis, Ralph Nader and Mitt Romney. Eight sitting U.S. senators are alumni of HLS: Romney, Ted Cruz, Mike Crapo, Tim Kaine, Jack Reed, Chuck Schumer, Tom Cotton, and Mark Warner.

Other legal and political leaders who attended HLS include former president of Taiwan, Ma Ying-jeou, and former vice president Annette Lu; the incumbent Chief Justice of India, Dhananjaya Y. Chandrachud; the incumbent Chief Justice of the Court of Final Appeal of Hong Kong, Andrew Cheung Kui-nung; former chief justice of the Republic of the Philippines, Renato Corona; Chief Justice of Singapore Sundaresh Menon; former president of the World Bank Group, Robert Zoellick; former United Nations high commissioner for human rights, Navanethem Pillay; the former president of Ireland, Mary Robinson; Lady Arden, Justice of the Supreme Court of the United Kingdom and Solomon Areda Waktolla, Deputy Chief Justice of the Federal Supreme Court of Ethiopia. Deputy Chief Justice Solomon Areda Waktolla is also member of the Court of the Permanent Court of Arbitration.

Lobsang Sangay is the first elected sikyong of the Tibetan Government in Exile. In 2004, he earned a S.J.D. degree from Harvard Law School and was a recipient of the 2004 Yong K. Kim' 95 Prize of excellence for his dissertation "Democracy in Distress: Is Exile Polity a Remedy? A Case Study of Tibet's Government-in-exile".

Sixteen of the school's graduates have served on the Supreme Court of the United States, more than any other law school. Four of the current nine members of the court graduated from HLS: the chief justice, John Roberts; associate justices Neil Gorsuch; Ketanji Brown Jackson; and Elena Kagan, who also served as the dean of Harvard Law School, from 2003 to 2009. Past Supreme Court justices from Harvard Law School include Antonin Scalia, David Souter, Harry Blackmun, William J. Brennan, Louis Brandeis, Felix Frankfurter, Lewis Powell (LLM), and Oliver Wendell Holmes Jr., among others. Ruth Bader Ginsburg attended Harvard Law School for two years.

Attorneys General Loretta Lynch, Alberto Gonzales, and Janet Reno, among others, and noted federal judges Richard Posner of the Seventh Circuit Court of Appeals, Michael Boudin of the First Circuit Court of Appeals, Joseph A. Greenaway of the Third Circuit Court of Appeals, Laurence Silberman of the D.C. Circuit Court of Appeals, Lawrence VanDyke of the Ninth Circuit Court of Appeals, and Pierre Leval of the Second Circuit Court of Appeals, among many other judicial figures, graduated from the school. The former Commonwealth solicitor general of Australia and current justice of the High Court of Australia, Stephen Gageler, senior counsel graduated from Harvard with an LL.M.

Many HLS alumni are leaders and innovators in the business world. Its graduates include the current senior chairman of Goldman Sachs, Lloyd Blankfein; former chief executive officer of Reddit, Ellen Pao; current chairman of the board and majority owner of National Amusements Sumner Redstone; current president and CEO of TIAA-CREF, Roger W. Ferguson Jr.; current CEO and chairman of Toys "R" Us, Gerald L. Storch; and former CEO of Delta Air Lines, Gerald Grinstein, among many others.

Legal scholars who graduated from Harvard Law include Payam Akhavan, William P. Alford, Rachel Barkow, Yochai Benkler, Alexander Bickel, Andrew Burrows, Erwin Chemerinsky, Amy Chua, Sujit Choudhry, Robert C. Clark, Hugh Collins, James Duane (professor), I. Glenn Cohen, Ronald Dworkin, Christopher Edley Jr., Melvin A. Eisenberg, Susan Estrich, Jody Freeman, Gerald Gunther, Andrew T. Guzman, Louis Henkin, Harold Koh, Richard J. Lazarus, Arthur R. Miller, Gerald L. Neuman, Eric Posner, Richard Posner, John Mark Ramseyer, Jed Rubenfeld, Lewis Sargentich, John Sexton, Jeannie Suk, Kathleen Sullivan, Cass Sunstein, Laurence Tribe, Edwin R. Keedy, C. Raj Kumar and Tim Wu.

In sports, David Otunga is the first and only Harvard Law alum to work for WWE. He is a two-time WWE Tag Team Champion.

Faculty

 William P. Alford
 Deborah Anker
 Yochai Benkler
 Robert C. Clark
 I. Glenn Cohen
 Susan P. Crawford
 Noah Feldman
 Roger Fisher
 William W. Fisher
 Jody Freeman
 Charles Fried
 Gerald Frug
 Nancy Gertner
 Mary Ann Glendon
 Jack Goldsmith
 Lani Guinier
 David Alan Hoffman
 Morton Horwitz
 Vicki C. Jackson
 David Kennedy
 Duncan Kennedy
 Randall Kennedy
 Michael Klarman
 Richard J. Lazarus
 Lawrence Lessig
 Kenneth W. Mack
 John F. Manning
 Frank Michelman
 Martha Minow
 Robert Harris Mnookin
 Ashish Nanda
 Charles Nesson
 Ruth Okediji
 Charles Ogletree
 John Mark Ramseyer
 Mark J. Roe
 Lewis Sargentich
 Robert Sitkoff
 Jeannie Suk
 Ronald S. Sullivan Jr.
 Cass Sunstein
 Laurence Tribe
 Mark Tushnet
 Rebecca Tushnet
 Roberto Unger
 Adrian Vermeule
 Steven M. Wise
 Jonathan Zittrain

Former faculty

 Paul M. Bator
 Joseph Henry Beale
 Derrick Bell
 Derek Bok
 Stephen Breyer
 Zechariah Chafee
 Abram Chayes
 Vern Countryman
 Archibald Cox
 Alan Dershowitz
 Christopher Edley Jr.
 Felix Frankfurter
 Paul A. Freund
 Lon Fuller
 John Chipman Gray
 Erwin Griswold
 Lani Guinier
 Henry M. Hart Jr.
 Oliver Wendell Holmes Jr.
 Wendy Jacobs
 Elena Kagan
 Christopher Columbus Langdell
 Daniel Meltzer
 Soia Mentschikoff
 Arthur R. Miller
 Elisabeth Owens
 John Palfrey
 Roscoe Pound
 John Rawls
 Joseph Story
 Kathleen Sullivan
 Elizabeth Warren
 Joseph H. H. Weiler
 Samuel Williston

Research programs and centers 

 Animal Law & Policy Program
 Berkman Klein Center for Internet and Society
 Center on the Legal Profession (CLP)
 Charles Hamilton Houston Institute for Race and Justice
 Child Advocacy Program (CAP)
 Criminal Justice Policy Program (CJPP)
 East Asian Legal Studies Program (EALS)
 Environmental & Energy Law Program
 Foundations of Private Law
 Harvard Initiative on Law and Philosophy
 Harvard Law School Project on Disability (HPOD)
 Human Rights Program (HRP)
 Institute for Global Law and Policy (IGLP)
 John M. Olin Center for Law, Economics and Business
 The Julis-Rabinowitz Program on Jewish and Israeli Law
 Labor and Worklife Program (LWP)
 The Petrie-Flom Center for Health Law Policy, Biotechnology, and Bioethics
 Program in Islamic Law (PIL)
 Program on Biblical Law and Christian Legal Studies (PBLCLS)
 Program on Behavioral Economics and Public Policy
 Program on Corporate Governance
 Program on Institutional Investors (PII)
 Program on International Financial Systems (PIFS)
 Program on International Law and Armed Conflict (PILAC)
 Program on Law and Society in the Muslim World
 Program on Negotiation (PON)
 Shareholder Rights Project (SRP)
 Systemic Justice Project (SJP)
 Tax Law Program

Buildings gallery

In popular culture

Books
The Paper Chase is a novel set amid a student's first ("One L") year at the school. It was written by John Jay Osborn, Jr., who studied at the school. The book was later turned into a film and a television series (see below).

Scott Turow wrote a memoir of his experience as a first-year law student at Harvard, One L.

Film and television
Several movies and television shows take place at least in part at the school. Most of them have scenes filmed on location at or around Harvard University. They include:
 Love Story (1970)
 The Paper Chase (1973)
 The Paper Chase (1978–1979, 1983–1986 television series)
 Soul Man (1986)
 The Firm (1993)
 A Civil Action (1998)
 How High (2001)
 Legally Blonde (2001)
 Catch Me If You Can (2002)
 Love Story in Harvard (2004 Korean TV series)
 Suits (TV Series) (2011–2019)
 On the Basis of Sex (2018)
Many popular movies and television shows also feature characters introduced as Harvard Law School graduates. The central plot point of the TV series Suits is that one of the main characters did not attend Harvard but fakes his graduate status in order to practice law.

See also

 Ames Moot Court Competition
 Harvard Association for Law & Business
 Harvard/MIT Cooperative Society
 List of Harvard University people
 List of Ivy League law schools

References

Further reading
 
 
 Chase, Anthony. "The Birth of the Modern Law School," American Journal of Legal History (1979) 23#4 pp. 329–48 in JSTOR
 Coquillette, Daniel R. and Bruce A. Kimball. On the Battlefield of Merit: Harvard Law School, the First Century (Harvard University Press, 2015) 666 pp. 
 
 Kimball, Bruce A. "The Proliferation of Case Method Teaching in American Law Schools: Mr. Langdell's Emblematic 'Abomination,' 1890–1915," History of Education Quarterly (2006) 46#2 pp. 192–240 in JSTOR
 Kimball, Bruce A.  '"Warn Students That I Entertain Heretical Opinions, Which They Are Not To Take as Law': The Inception of Case Method Teaching in the Classrooms of the Early C.C. Langdell, 1870–1883," Law and History Review 17 (Spring 1999): 57–140.
 LaPiana, William P. Logic and Experience: The Origin of Modern American Legal Education (1994)
  + v.2, v.3

External links

 

Environmental law schools
 
Law schools in Massachusetts
Law School
1817 establishments in Massachusetts
Educational institutions established in 1817
Universities and colleges in Cambridge, Massachusetts
Robert A. M. Stern buildings